Bryan Cunningham, Jr. (born May 29, 1989) is a Canadian football wide receiver who is currently a free agent. He was most recently a member of the Ottawa Redblacks of the Canadian Football League (CFL). He played college football for Michigan State. He was selected in the sixth round at the 183rd overall pick in the 2012 NFL Draft by the Miami Dolphins.

Early years
Cunningham attended Westerville South High School in Westerville, Ohio. As a senior, he had 45 receptions for 770 yards and nine touchdowns.

College career
Cunningham concluded his career at Michigan State as the school's all-time leader in receptions (218) and receiving yards (3,086). He also ranks second in career TD receptions with 25.

Professional career

Miami Dolphins
He was selected in the sixth round of the 2012 NFL Draft by the Miami Dolphins On May 17 of that year, Cunningham signed a four-year $2.2 million contract; includes a $106,000 signing bonus. Cunningham was, however, cut by the Dolphins on August 31, 2012.

Philadelphia Eagles
Cunningham was signed to the Philadelphia Eagles practice squad on September 1, 2012. On August 1, 2013, Cunningham was waived with an injury settlement by the Philadelphia Eagles. On October 14, 2013, Cunningham was re-signed to the Eagles' active roster. He was released on November 12, 2013. Two days later, he was signed to Eagles' practice squad.

Chicago Bears
Cunningham was signed to the Chicago Bears practice squad on November 12, 2014.

Montreal Alouettes
Cunningham was signed by the Montreal Alouettes on July 28, 2015. After a modest 2015 season Cunningham had a breakout 2016 campaign, playing in 17 regular season games catching 65 passes for 855 yards with 4 touchdowns. The following season, in 2017, he had the best season of his career, catching 69 passes for 1,128 yards with 4 touchdowns. Cunningham missed four games in the 2018 season but was still a significant contributor to the Alouettes' passing attack.  In February 2019, Cunningham signed a contract extension with Montreal. In August 2019, Cunningham suffered a fractured wrist and played in just six games. He signed a one-year contract extension with the Alouettes on January 25, 2021. For the 2021 season, Cunningham played in nine games where he had 36 receptions for 474 yards and one touchdown. He became a free agent upon the expiry of his contract on February 8, 2022.

Ottawa Redblacks
On February 10, 2022, it was announced that Cunningham had signed with the Ottawa Redblacks. Cunningham was released as part of the team's final roster cuts on June 4, 2022.

References

External links

 Ottawa Redblacks bio
 Philadelphia Eagles bio
 Michigan State Spartans bio

1989 births
Living people
American football wide receivers
Canadian football wide receivers
American players of Canadian football
Michigan State Spartans football players
Miami Dolphins players
Philadelphia Eagles players
Chicago Bears players
Montreal Alouettes players
Ottawa Redblacks players
Players of American football from Ohio
People from Westerville, Ohio